King's Highway 416, commonly referred to as Highway 416 and as the Veterans Memorial Highway, is a 400-series highway in the Canadian province of Ontario that connects the Trans-Canada Highway (Highway 417) in Ottawa with Highway 401 between Brockville and Cornwall. The  freeway acts as an important trade corridor from Interstate 81 between New York and Eastern Ontario via Highway 401, as well as the fastest link between Ottawa and Toronto. Highway 416 passes through a largely rural area, except near its northern terminus where it enters the suburbs of Ottawa. The freeway also serves several communities along its length, notably Spencerville and Kemptville.

Highway 416 had two distinct construction phases. Highway 416 "North" was the  segment starting from an interchange at Highway 417 and bypassing the original route of Highway 16 into Ottawa (now Prince of Wales Drive) along a new right-of-way. Sections of both opened throughout the late 1990s. Highway 416 was commemorated as the Veterans Memorial Highway on the 54th anniversary of D-Day in 1998. The final link was officially opened by a World War I veteran and local officials on September 23, 1999.

Route description 

Highway 416 begins at an interchange with Highway 401, branching to the north near the community of Johnstown in the United Counties of Leeds and Grenville. This interchange only provides access to and from the west of Highway 401, but immediately north of it, a second interchange with the remaining section of Highway 16 provides access from Johnstown and to a parclo interchange with both directions of Highway 401, as well as to the Ogdensburg-Prescott International Bridge crossing to Ogdensburg, New York.
Proceeding north, the two carriageways of the freeway are separated by a  forested median.
The route is surrounded by thick forests for the next . As it passes beneath Leeds and Grenville County Road 44, the original routing of Highway 16 (the Prescott Highway) south of Spencerville, it exits the forest and enters farm fields. The route travels to the east of the community, access to which is provided by an interchange at County Road 21, and crosses a swamp and the South Nation River.

Highway 416 crosses under the Prescott Highway a second time; to the north, the two remain roughly parallel but separated as they pass through a mix of farmland and forest. South of the community of Kemptville, the Prescott Highway crosses the route a third time, with an interchange connecting the two highways.
The freeway curves to the northeast, bypassing Kemptville and featuring an interchange with County Road 43 (formerly Highway 43).
It crosses the line of the old Bytown and Prescott Railway,
then curves to the northwest, providing an interchange with River Road. At the southeast corner of the River Road interchange is the Veterans Commemorative Park, dedicated in 2000 by the Royal Canadian Legion.

It crosses the Rideau River and enters the City of Ottawa. Aside from the first couple of kilometres north of the Rideau River, the majority of the freeway cuts through swaths of farmland which fill the Ottawa Valley. The median also becomes narrower. The freeway encounters an interchange with Dilworth Road and thereafter with Roger Stevens Drive, the latter providing access to North Gower.

Continuing north of Manotick through fields, Highway 416 is crossed by the Prescott Highway for the fourth and final time as that road turns northeast and travels into downtown Ottawa as Prince of Wales Drive. Shortly thereafter is an interchange with Brophy Drive / Bankfield Road; the latter provides access to the Prescott Highway / Prince of Wales Drive. Approaching urban Ottawa, the route passes alongside a large quarry, then jogs to the west along an S-curve, crossing the Jock River in the process. After this, an interchange with Fallowfield Road provides access to the suburb of Barrhaven which occupies portions of the land immediately east of the freeway. The route jogs back to the east along a second S-curve and passes through an aesthetically designed bridge while traveling alongside the Stony Swamp.

The final section of Highway 416 travels parallel to Cedarview Road, which was relocated for the freeway. The Stony Swamp lies west of the route while farmland lies to the east. At the northern end of the swamp is an interchange with West Hunt Club Road. The freeway continues through a section of greenspace before descending gently into a trench. It passes beneath Bruin Road and the Ottawa Central Railway while traveling alongside Lynwood Village in Bells Corners. The highway is crossed by Baseline Road and Richmond Road; the former provides an onramp to southbound Highway 416. The freeway ends at a large interchange with the Trans-Canada Highway, Highway 417 (Exit 131), just south of the Lakeview and Bayshore communities on the Ottawa River; downtown Ottawa is to the east and Kanata is to the west.

Design features 
The Stony Swamp overpass at the southern entrance to Ottawa is a pre-tensioned concrete arch; the design, which allows the structure to cross the entire right of way with a single span, won the 1996 Award of Excellence from the Portland Cement Association. The bridge acts as a gateway to the National Capital Region and is the longest rigid frame bridge in Ontario with a  span.
In the same vicinity, the freeway sinks below ground level in a trench; groundwater-retaining walls were installed to prevent the lowering of the water table in adjacent wetlands, therefore mitigating damage to them.

At the Jock River, southwest of Barrhaven, deposits of sensitive leda clay presented a challenge in designing the crossing for the freeway as well as the Canadian National Railway overpass to the north. It was feared that the weight of these structures could destabilize the clay deposits beneath and lead to landslides. In place of the standard heavier aggregate, lighter blast furnace slag, at half the weight, was substituted.

Sloped rock cuts line the side of the freeway in numerous locations. With the intent of reducing the severity of collisions against those cuts, the Ministry of Transportation of Ontario (MTO) tested out numerous alternatives to strike a cost-to-benefit balance. The study concluded that although an initially higher investment would be required, the 2:1 sloped cut with grass overlaid produced the best results.

History

Highway 16 New 
In 1966, the Department of Highways (DHO), predecessor to today's MTO, published the Eastern Ontario Highway Planning Study, identifying the need for a controlled-access highway between Ottawa and Highway 401.
Highway 16, which passes over the geologically subdued St. Lawrence Lowlands, was selected over Highway 15, which crosses the undulating Canadian Shield to the west, as the ideal route for the new link.
Highway 16 was one of the first roads taken over by the expanding Department of Public Highways in 1918. The important corridor between the Trans-provincial Highway (Highway 2) and Ottawa was known as the Prescott Highway. In 1925, the road was given a numerical designation to supplement the name.
This highway served the low traffic volumes of the day, but as the number of vehicles increased over the first half of the 20th century, issues arose with the numerous private driveways along the route. To overcome this issue of abutting properties long-established on the old Highway 16 corridor, the DHO began purchasing a new right-of-way between Highway 401 and Century Road by late 1967 for a two-lane bypass of the original alignment, avoiding all the built-up areas that the original Highway 16 encountered. This route was designed to easily accommodate the eventual upgrade to a freeway when traffic volumes necessitated.

Construction of the super two, dubbed Highway 16 New, took place between 1969 and 1983. The Spencerville Bypass opened by 1971, connecting with the old highway in the south near Crowder Road and in the north near Ventnor Road.
By the end of 1973, the new highway was completed from immediately north of Highway 401 through Leeds and Grenville United Counties and into Ottawa–Carleton. This included a bypass around Kemptville and a new structure over the Rideau River. The new highway ended at Dilworth Road (Regional Road 13).

For nearly a decade, no new construction took place. Then, during the summer of 1982, the MTO awarded a contract to construct the route north from Dilworth Road towards Manotick, bypassing North Gower and extending the route as far north as Roger Stevens Drive (Regional Road 6), including a structure over Stevens Creek. Following completion of this first contract, a second contract was awarded for the remaining distance north to Century Road (Regional Road 8).
The project was completed in 1983, merging into the original route of Highway 16 northeast of the present Prince of Wales Drive overpass.

With the completion of Highway 16 New, the MTO needed only to construct interchanges and the southbound lanes in order to create a full freeway corridor.

Change of plans 
However, when it came time to construct this section, public attitudes had shifted and environmental concerns had come to the forefront of everyday life; new roads were now subject to intense public scrutiny. Suburbs grew along Merivale Road, prompting the Region of Ottawa–Carleton to request the MTO decommission the right-of-way along the road in 1977, which it did. The passing of the Environmental Assessment Act in 1975, however, meant that new projects were subject to a lengthy investigation of social and environmental concerns.

In 1981, the MTO began an environmental assessment into a new alignment for the northern connection with the Queensway. It was approved in mid-1987, with Cedarview Drive chosen as the ideal alignment for the new freeway. The MTO set out to design a four-lane route to connect the Queensway with Highway 16 New, including a three-level free-flow interchange. A contract for construction of this interchange was awarded in late 1989 and construction began in 1990. During the 1991 construction season, contracts were awarded to construct several overpasses along the new route.
This contract was completed in 1993, after which budgetary restraints prevented the awarding of further contracts. As a result, aside from the interchange at Highway 417 and some overpasses, construction activity on Highway 416 came to a standstill for two years.

It was during this period that the MTO undertook an engineering review of the entire route in search of cost inefficiencies. Highways 416 and 407 were constructed during a recession in the mid-1990s. Highway 407 became a tolled highway and for a time it was mentioned in legislative debates that Highway 416 would also be tolled, but ultimately this never happened. Instead, a hiatus in construction allowed engineers to evaluate inefficiencies in bridge and cross-section designs, as well as sensitive clay soils near Ottawa. This initiative led to a cost savings of over $7 million and several of the unique design features located along the length of the freeway.

Twinning and completion 
Work resumed on Highway 416 North following the review. It was opened from Century Road to Hunt Club Road on July 16, 1996, and completed on July 31, 1997, with the opening of the interchange with Highway 417. The cost of this section was $196 million. On December 8, 1995, in North Gower, the provincial and federal governments announced a financing deal to ensure Highway 416 South was completed by 2000.
This section of the route was constructed through a process known as twinning in which a second carriageway is built parallel to an existing road. In addition, existing intersections were rebuilt as grade-separated interchanges.
With the right-of-way along Highway 16 New already purchased, construction was able to proceed without disruption to local properties or traffic.

The  project was constructed through five contracts. Another contract was awarded one month later to Bot Construction, on August 19. On June 12, 1997, the first section opened, connecting with the Ottawa Bypass at Century Road.
On July 10, the third contract was awarded to Armbro Construction to construct the  section from Highway 43 south to Grenville County Road 20 (Oxford Station Road). The fifth and final contract was awarded to Armbro Construction on April 8, 1998, calling for the construction of the southern  and the two flyover ramps at Highway 401. The section between Roger Stevens Drive and what had now become Leeds and Grenville County Road 43, including a second crossing of the Rideau River, opened to traffic on June 26, 1998.
This was followed two months later by the section between Highway 43 and Oxford Station Road, which opened on August 24.

On the fifty-fourth anniversary of D-Day, June 6, 1998, then Transportation Minister Tony Clement unveiled two signs in Ottawa and formally declared the entire length of Highway 416 as the Veterans Memorial Highway, despite earlier reluctance from previous minister Al Palladini.
Six additional signs were also installed along the length of the route.
At the time, the Veterans Memorial Parkway in London already existed. Since then, two additional veterans highways have been named: on October 20, 2002, the Veterans Highway was designated in Halton Region along Regional Road 25;
on September 23, 2010, the Niagara Veterans Memorial Highway was designated in Niagara Falls along Regional Road 420.
A ceremony was held in Johnstown on September 23, 1999 to open the final section of Highway 416 that would complete the link from Highway 401 to Highway 417. Premier Mike Harris, Transportation Minister David Turnbull and World War I Veteran James W. Fraser officially opened the highway.

On December 14, 2009, there was a 60–70 vehicle pileup due to fog and icy conditions, forcing the closure of the highway in both directions.

Exit list

See also 

 Southern Ontario Transportation

References

Notes

External links 

 Highway 416 at AsphaltPlanet
 Video of the entire northbound Highway 416

16
Monuments and memorials in Ontario